Joseph Edson (March 3, 1782 - March 7, 1832) was a farmer, military leader, and government official in Vermont.  Among the offices in which he served were United States Marshal for the District of Vermont (1823-1829), Sheriff of Orange County (1812-1813, 1815-1822), and commander of the Vermont Militia's 4th Division with the rank of major general in 1822.

Life

Early life
Joseph Edson was born in Randolph, Vermont on March 3, 1782, a son of Josiah Edson (1758-1819) and Sarah (Pinney) Edson (1756-1804).  He was educated in Randolph and became a farmer.  A Democratic-Republican, Edson began a career in government at an early age, serving as a town constable from 1805 to 1809.  after serving as deputy sheriff, he was elected Sheriff of Orange County and served from 1812 to 1813, and then again from 1815 to 1822.

Edson also became active in the militia.  During the War of 1812 he was commissioned as a major, and helped organize the Randolph-area contingent that took part in the defense of Plattsburgh in September 1814.  He continued to serve in the militia, and was commander of 1st Brigade, 4th Division from 1818 to 1822 with the rank of brigadier general.  In 1822 he was appointed to command the 4th Division and promoted to major general.

From 1815 to 1821, Edson served as a trustee of Randolph's Orange County Grammar School.  In March 1823, Edson was appointed United States Marshal for the District of Vermont, succeeding Heman Allen.  He served until June 1829, when he was succeeded by Heman Lowry.

Edson died in Randolph on March 7, 1832.  He was buried at Randolph Center Cemetery in Randolph.

Family
In 1802, Edson married Sarah Throop (1783-1863) of Bethel, Vermont.  They were the parents of five children:

 Elizabeth (1804-1850), the wife of Rev. George H. Williams, a professor at the University of Michigan
 Sarah (1806-1851), the wife of Edmund Weston of Randolph
 Nathaniel (1808-1853), a graduate of Union College who studied law with Dudley Chase and became an attorney in Albany, New York
 Royal (1811-1849), a merchant in Woodstock, Vermont
 Olivia (1824-1893), the wife of Rev. John A. Wilson, pastor of a church in Ypsilanti, Michigan

References

Sources

Books

Newspapers

Internet

External links

1782 births
1832 deaths
People from Randolph, Vermont
American militiamen in the War of 1812
American militia generals
Vermont Democratic-Republicans
Vermont sheriffs
United States Marshals
Burials in Vermont